510 Squadron or 510th Squadron may refer to:

No. 510 Squadron RAF, United Kingdom
510th Bombardment Squadron, United States
510th Fighter Squadron, United States
510th Missile Squadron, United States